Rural Hill may refer to:

 Rural Hill, Illinois, an unincorporated community in Hamilton County
 Rural Hill, Tennessee, a census-designated place in Wilson County